Jean-Paul M'Bono (born 27 January 1946) is a former Congo international football forward.

Career
Born in Brazzaville, M'Bono began playing club football for local side Caïman Brazzaville. After a brief spell with AS Dragons, he joined Étoile du Congo where he would spend the rest of his club career. He won the African Golden Boot in 1972.

M'Bono made several appearances for the senior Congo national football team, including FIFA World Cup qualifying matches, and he played at the  1972 African Cup of Nations finals, where he would score four goals as Congo won the championship.

After retiring from playing, M'Bono went into football administration, eventually becoming the President of the Congolese Football Federation in 2010.

References

External links

1946 births
Living people
Sportspeople from Brazzaville
Africa Cup of Nations-winning players
Republic of the Congo footballers
Republic of the Congo international footballers
1968 African Cup of Nations players
1972 African Cup of Nations players
1974 African Cup of Nations players
African Games gold medalists for the Republic of the Congo
African Games medalists in football
Association football forwards
Footballers at the 1965 All-Africa Games
Étoile du Congo players